Ayodhyanagar  is a village development committee in Siraha District in the Sagarmatha Zone of south-eastern Nepal. At the time of the 2011 Nepal census it had a population of 4433 people living in 842 individual households. Some says that it is the place where God Ram was born.

References

External links
UN map of the municipalities of  Siraha District

Populated places in Siraha District